Franciszek Ksawery Szymczyk (21 February 1892 – 5 November 1976) was a Polish track cyclist who competed in the 1924 Summer Olympics. He was born in Lemberg and died in Warsaw.

In 1924 he won the silver as member of the Polish team in the team pursuit. He also competed in the sprint event but was eliminated in the quarter-finals.

References

External links
profile 

1892 births
1976 deaths
Polish male cyclists
Polish track cyclists
Olympic cyclists of Poland
Cyclists at the 1924 Summer Olympics
Olympic silver medalists for Poland
Sportspeople from Lviv
Olympic medalists in cycling
Medalists at the 1924 Summer Olympics
Polish Austro-Hungarians
People from the Kingdom of Galicia and Lodomeria